Wallis Randell (born 14 July 2001) is an Australian rules footballer playing for the Gold Coast Suns in the AFL Women's (AFLW).

Early life
Randell grew up on a cane farm in Carmila, Queensland, located 108km south of Mackay. She was a talented basketballer in her younger years and represented Queensland in national competitions before switching her attention to Australian rules football.

AFL Women's career
Randell made her AFLW debut for the Gold Coast Suns in 2021.

References

External links
 

2001 births
Living people
Sportswomen from Queensland
Australian rules footballers from Queensland
Gold Coast Football Club (AFLW) players